Allen Cromwell Barbee (1911–2004) was an American politician.

Barbee was one of eight children born to John Lucian Barbee and Deborah Vester Barbee. He graduated from Spring Hope High School in Spring Hope, North Carolina and received a football scholarship to the University of North Carolina at Chapel Hill. Barbee founded the local newspaper, the Spring Hope Enterprise in 1947. Politically, Barbee was affiliated with the Democratic Party. He was active in municipal politics for nine years as a member of the Spring Hope Town Board and mayor of the town. He won his first election to the North Carolina House of Representatives in November 1960, and left the office to contest the Democratic nomination for the 1972 North Carolina lieutenant gubernatorial election, which went to Jim Hunt. Barbee returned to the state house after winning the 1974 state legislative elections, and served continuously through 1987, when he was defeated by Roy Cooper in the Democratic primary. He died on 11 February 2004, at the age of 93.

References

1910s births
2004 deaths
Democratic Party members of the North Carolina House of Representatives
People from Nash County, North Carolina
20th-century American politicians
20th-century American newspaper founders
North Carolina Tar Heels football players
North Carolina city council members
Mayors of places in North Carolina